Sugar Mountain is an American thriller film directed by Richard Gray and written by Abe Pogos. The film stars Cary Elwes, Jason Momoa, Drew Roy, Haley Webb, and Shane Coffey. Filming began on March 10, 2014 in Seward, Alaska and ended on April 18.

The film was released in the US on December 9, 2016.

Premise
A man tries to fake going missing for a few days to sell his survival story. But, things quickly get out of hand.

Cast 
 Cary Elwes as Jim Huxley
 Jason Momoa as Joe Bright
 Drew Roy as Miles West
 Haley Webb as Lauren Huxley
 Shane Coffey as Liam West
 Melora Walters as Tracey Huxley
 Anna Hutchison as Angie Miller
 John Karna as Josh Miller

Production 
The film originally had been set in Australia until the filmmakers found a suitable location in Alaska. The executive producer responsible for arranging a considerable amount of the film finance was Kaine Harling. Principal photography began March 10, 2014 in the town of Seward, lasting six weeks. Filming ended on April 18, 2014.

References

External links 
 
 

2016 films
2010s comedy thriller films
American comedy thriller films
Films directed by Richard Gray
Films set in Alaska
Films shot in Alaska
2016 comedy films
2010s English-language films
2010s American films